Citizens Savings and Loan Association may refer to:
 
Citizens Savings and Loan Association (California), California S&L which became a subsidiary of National Steel Corporation
Citizens Savings and Loan Association (Ohio), Cleveland S&L which became Citizens Savings and Trust Company

See also
Citizens Bank (disambiguation)